The chestnut-crested yuhina (Staphida everetti) is a species of bird in the white-eye family Zosteropidae. The species has been included in the genus Staphida, along with the Indochinese yuhina and the striated yuhina of mainland Asia, and all three have been considered a single species. The scientific name commemorates British colonial administrator and zoological collector Alfred Hart Everett.

Distribution and habitat
It is found in Brunei, Indonesia, and Malaysia where it is endemic to the island of Borneo. They are common and are often one of the most common species in their range.

References

chestnut-crested yuhina
Endemic birds of Borneo
chestnut-crested yuhina
chestnut-crested yuhina
Taxobox binomials not recognized by IUCN
Fauna of the Borneo montane rain forests